Novy Zirgan (Yañı Yergän) is a rural locality (a selo) and the administrative centre of Novozirgansky Selsoviet, Khaybullinsky District, Bashkortostan, Russia. The population was 629 as of 2010. There are 3 streets.

Geography 
Novy Zirgan is located 11 km southeast of Akyar (the district's administrative centre) by road. Tanatar is the nearest rural locality.

References 

Rural localities in Khaybullinsky District